Morning Sun is a 2003 documentary film by Carma Hinton about the Cultural Revolution in China.

The film uses archival and propaganda footage from the era as well as interviews with Red Guard participants and victims to explore the events and effects of the Cultural Revolution.

In the United States, the film garnered largely positive reviews. It won the American Historical Association John E. O'Connor Film Award in 2004 and was nominated or a finalist in regards to a handful of other awards and film festivals.

In South Korea, the film was broadcast by EBS in 2000. However, due to pressure from the Chinese Government, it was only broadcast once, at 4:30 A.M.

See also
List of documentary films about the People's Republic of China

References

External links

Nick Fraser Storyville Series Editor
Morning Sun website
Center for Asian American Media - North American distributor of the film
Morning Sun Documents China's Cultural Revolution - NPR interview with the film's creator
 

American documentary films
2000s Mandarin-language films
2003 television films
2003 films
Documentary films about China
Red Guards
Films about the Cultural Revolution
2003 documentary films
2000s English-language films
2000s American films
2003 multilingual films
American multilingual films